William Daniel may refer to:

William Daniel (bishop) (died 1628), Church of Ireland archbishop
William Daniel (judge) (1806–1873), Virginia jurist
William Daniel (Maryland politician) (1826–1897), American politician
William Daniel (died 1633) , English Member of Parliament for Truro, 1601
William B. Daniel (1840–1921), American politician in the Virginia House of Delegates
William Barker Daniel (1754–1833), Church of England clergyman and writer on field sports
William D. S. Daniel (1903–1988), Assyrian author, poet and musician
Willie Daniel (1937–2015), American football player

See also
Bill Daniel (disambiguation)
William Daniell (disambiguation)

 William Daniels (disambiguation)